Roger Harrison Lonsdale, FBA (6 August 1934 – 28 February 2022) was a British literary scholar and academic born in Hornsea, East Riding of Yorkshire. He was a Fellow and Tutor at Balliol College Oxford from 1963 to 2000, and Professor of English Literature at the University of Oxford from 1992 to 2000. He was elected a Fellow of the British Academy in 1991. Lonsdale died in Oxford on 28 February 2022, at the age of 87. He was married to the archaeologist Nicoletta Momigliano.

Bibliography
 Dr Charles Burney: A literary Biography (Clarendon Press, 1965)
 Editor. The Poems of Gray, Collins and Goldsmith (Longmans, Green and Company, 1969)
 Editor. William Beckford's Vathek (OUP, 1970)
 Editor. History of literature in the English language. 4: the Augustans. (Barrie and Jenkins, 1970-75)
 Editor. Dryden to Johnson. (Barrie and Jenkins, 1971)
 Editor. The New Oxford Book of Eighteenth Century Verse (OUP, 1984)
 Editor. Eighteenth century women poets: an Oxford anthology (OUP, 1989)
 Editor.  The Lives of Most Eminent English Poets by Samuel Johnson (OUP, 2006)

References

1934 births
2022 deaths
Fellows of Balliol College, Oxford
Fellows of the British Academy
Fellows of the Royal Society of Literature